Aliki Konstantinidou (born June 26, 1989 in Thessaloniki, Greece) is a female professional volleyball player from Greece, who has been a member of the Greece women's national volleyball team. At club level, she plays for Greek powerhouse Olympiacos Piraeus (2017–18 season). Meanwhile, in a previous season she won with the Piraeus team both the Greek Championship and the Greek Cup.

Sporting achievements

International competitions

 2017/2018 : CEV Women's Challenge Cup, with Olympiacos S.F. Piraeus

National championships
 2014/2015  Hellenic Championship, with Olympiacos Piraeus
 2016/2017  3rd place in Hellenic Championship, with Panathinaikos Athens
 2017/2018  Hellenic Championship, with Olympiacos Piraeus
 2018/2019  Hellenic Championship, with Olympiacos Piraeus

National trophies
 2013/2014  Runners up in Hellenic Cup, with Pannaxiakos A.O. Naxos
 2014/2015  Hellenic Cup, with Olympiacos Piraeus
 2015/2016  Runners up in Hellenic Cup, with AEK Athens
 2017/2018  Hellenic Cup, with Olympiacos Piraeus
 2018/2019  Hellenic Cup, with Olympiacos Piraeus

References

External links
 profile at greekvolley.eu 
 profile at CEV web site at cev.eu
 profile at women.volleybox.net
 Back to Olympiacos Piraeus  www.novasports.gr 
 Olympiacos Women's Volleyball team at Olympiacos official web site (www.olympiacossfp.gr)
 Hellenic Women National Team - caps www.volleyball.gr

1989 births
Living people
Olympiacos Women's Volleyball players
Panathinaikos Women's Volleyball players
Greek women's volleyball players
Volleyball players from Thessaloniki
21st-century Greek women